Antoine Chedid is a Lebanese lawyer and diplomat who served as Lebanon ambassador to the United States from 2007 to 2016.

Education and career 
Chedid was educated at the University of Saint Joseph. He started his diplomatic career in 1978, when he joined the Foreign Service. He served in the Lebanese foreign missions in Greece and in the United States as an assistant to the Secretary General of the Ministry of Foreign Affairs from 1979 to 1984. He rose to the rank of Consul General and served in Los Angeles, California from 1984 to 1986 and later became presidential adviser for American affairs serving between 1989 and 1991 and as head of the America Desk Office in the Ministry of Foreign Affairs. He was deployed to Lebanon consulate in New York as Consul General in 1991 and served there until 1998 when he was appointed ambassador to Greece where he served until 2000. From 2001 to 2007, he served as the head of the Bureau of International Organizations, Conferences and Cultural Relations at the Ministry of Foreign Affairs in Beirut.

Honour 
In 2015, the National U.S.-Arab Chamber of Commerce (NUSACC) named him Ambassador of the Year.

References 

20th-century Lebanese lawyers
Ambassadors of Lebanon to the United States
University of Saint Joseph (Connecticut) alumni
Living people
Year of birth missing (living people)
Ambassadors of Lebanon to Greece
Saint Joseph University alumni